Beckbury is a village and civil parish in Shropshire, England. It has a pub – the Smokey Cow, a Church of England school, a village hall, and a parish church dedicated to St Milburga (who was Abbess at Much Wenlock in Saxon times).

Beckbury makes up one of the six parishes of Beckbury, Ryton, Kemberton, Badger, Sutton Maddock and Stockton, which became a united benefice in 1989 (the first group of 6 parishes in the Diocese of Lichfield).

Beckbury was included in the Domesday Book and the name means Beocca's Fort or defended place (Beocca being someone's name).

The village was struck by an F0/T1 tornado on 23 November 1981, as part of the record-breaking nationwide tornado outbreak on that day.

See also
 Listed buildings in Beckbury

References

External links

Villages in Shropshire
Civil parishes in Shropshire